Noble Academy is an independent day school in Greensboro, North Carolina. The school exclusively serves students with diagnosed learning disabilities or learning differences such as Attention Deficit/Hyperactive Disorder (ADHD) or Central Auditory Processing Disorder (CAPD). Noble Academy's mission is to empower students with learning differences to pursue their highest potential within a comprehensive, supportive educational environment.

History 

Noble Academy was founded in 1987 under the name "Unlimited Learning" by Ginger Parnell and Rita Rice as a testing and tutorial service in Greensboro. In 1990, the school changed its name to Guilford Day School and adopted the Knight as the school mascot. In 1992, the school relocated to its current property on Horse Pen Creek Road. In 2010, the school went through a re-branding process that recommended that the school change its name. Based on feedback from students and parents, the Knight was kept as the school mascot, and the name was changed to Noble Academy to align with that symbolism. In 2012, Noble Academy opened a new building for its Upper School (6th–12th grades), allowing its Lower School to expand within the previous building. The school is accredited by the Southern Association of Independent Schools.

Programs 

In addition to its college prep curriculum following the North Carolina standard course of study, Noble Academy offers a variety of opportunities to its students:

Noble Academy is a SMART Showcase school, and has SMART interactive whiteboards in all of its classrooms.  The technology is used extensively within the classroom.

Noble Academy is a full day school program that includes visual and performing arts as electives as well as extracurricular activities and a year-round athletics program.  Sports offered include soccer, basketball, volleyball, golf, cross country, flag football, and eSports.

References 

Schools in Greensboro, North Carolina